New Majority is a Canadian current affairs television series which aired on CBC Television from 1970 to 1972.

Premise
Subject material in this series concerned young adults aged up to their mid-20s who according to popular belief comprised most of the population, hence the series title. Previously, the CBC dealt with such subject matter in the series Through the Eyes of Tomorrow (1966–1969). Topics included suicide, social welfare, alternative lifestyles, contemporary music and culture. Reporting and editing staff included Ed Fitzgerald, Allen Kates, Marie Morgan and Richard Wells who were aged in their early 20s.

Episodes of this Toronto-based series included discussion, interview and filmed report segments. As the 1971 episodes began, New Majority converted to a magazine style with segments contributed by other CBC production centres such as Edmonton, Halifax, Montreal, Ottawa, Vancouver and Winnipeg.

Scheduling
This series was broadcast as follows:

References

External links
 

CBC Television original programming
1970 Canadian television series debuts
1972 Canadian television series endings